Anthony Sinclair (born 13 March 1966) is a former Australian rules footballer who played for the Sydney Swans in the Victorian Football League (VFL).

Notes

External links 
		

Living people
1966 births
Australian rules footballers from Victoria (Australia)
Sydney Swans players